The Yanda were an indigenous Australian people of the state of Queensland.

Country
They were also the indigenous people of Toolebuc and Lucknow.

Social organization and customs
The Yanda were the most easterly aboriginal tribe to have accepted both circumcision and subincision into their initiatory rites. On ceremonial occasions, Yanda women adorned themselves with a distinctive ornament called a bowra, fashioned from two kangaroo teeth, fixed together with sinews and resins at the base. They consumed pituri by chewing on a compound of it made with the ashes of gidea leaves.

History of contact
Yanda lands were first occupied by whites in 1878, at which time they were estimated to number some 100, several of them octogenarians. Within less than a decade, the figure had been halved, with the remnant of 50 consisting of 15 men, 20 women and 15 children.

Alternative names
 Janda
 Yunda

Some words
 mikamo (tame/wild dog)
 koopoon (father)
 yunganna (mother)
 gungi / goongin (white man)

Notes

Citations

Sources

Aboriginal peoples of Queensland